Pradosia argentea was a species of plant in the family Sapotaceae. It was endemic to Peru.

References

argentea
Extinct plants
Endemic flora of Peru
Taxonomy articles created by Polbot